Billy Scott (October 5, 1942 – November 17, 2012) was an American R&B singer, who was lead vocalist for the group The Prophets, later known as "The Georgia Prophets", and eventually "Billy Scott & The Party Prophets". He was known for Beach music hits such as "I Got the Fever" and "California".

Early life
Billy Scott was born in 1942 as Peter Pendleton in Huntington, West Virginia.

In 1995 Billy and DJ Curtiss Carpenter formed the CAMMYS (Carolina Magical Music years) which today is known as the Carolina Beach Music Awards. The first in 1995 was held at the then Holiday Inn in Salisbury, NC; the next two years were in Charlotte before it moved to its permanent home in Myrtle Beach, SC.

Before forming The Prophets in 1965, he sang with various groups while in the Army, and after he was discharged in 1964 took the stage name "Billy Scott".

In 1968, he gained his first gold record for the song "I Got the Fever".

In the 1970s, he and his band recorded a number of songs in the beach music genre, a regional variant of R&B. Scott was a regular guest on the Jerry Peeler Beach Show on WANS radio in Anderson, SC.

Later life and death
In 2006, Billy Scott released his final album and on Saturday November 17, 2012, he died of pancreatic and liver cancer at his home in Charlotte, North Carolina.

References

External links
 Official Website

1942 births
2012 deaths
African-American male singer-songwriters
American rhythm and blues singer-songwriters
Musicians from Huntington, West Virginia
20th-century African-American male singers
21st-century African-American male singers
Singer-songwriters from West Virginia